An American ABC is a 1941 picture book by Maud and Miska Petersham. It is an ABC book of Americana. The book was a recipient of a 1942 Caldecott Honor for its illustrations.

References

1941 children's books
American picture books
Caldecott Honor-winning works